Joe Wilson is a fictional character appearing in several well-known short stories by Australian writer Henry Lawson.
Joe Wilson first appeared in "Brighten's Sister-in-law," the first story Lawson wrote after his arrival to England, and the longest he had ever written up to that time. It was first published in Blackwood's Magazine in November 1900.

Published Joe Wilson Stories

Publication
"Joe Wilson's Courtship" was the final Joe Wilson story to have been written, though, chronologically, its events take place first. In 1901, when all four stories were published in the collection Joe Wilson and His Mates, the stories were printed in order of narrative chronology.

After the fourth story, Lawson added the following note, under the title "The Writer Wants to Say a Word":

Reception
According to The Oxford Companion to Australian Literature, the sequence of Joe Wilson stories "has been justly admired for its controlled presentation of the process of alienation and disintegration wrought by the experience of bush life." Kerryn Goldsworthy writes that the stories represent "the most sustained example we have of Lawson's skills in narrative and characterisation."

Adaptations
The Joe Wilson stories were adapted into the 1924 silent movie Joe, and the 1998 miniseries Joe Wilson. They were also adapted into a segment of the 1957 movie Three in One.

References

Characters in novels of the 20th century
Wilson, Joe